Simone de Magistris (known from 1555–1613) was an Italian painter and sculptor.

Born at Caldarola, Marche, he was the son of Giovanni Andrea de Magistris and Camilla di Ambrogio, and brother to Palmino and to Giovanni Francesco, both painters. After leaving the family workshop, he moved to Loreto, where he studied for a while under the aged Lorenzo Lotto.

He is considered "one of the first exponents of the Mannerist style" in paintings.

De Magistris worked for a long time under cardinal Giovanni Evangelista Pallotta, who largely contributed to the renovation of Caldarola in the Marche. A Pietà is on display in the Pinacoteca Civica Scipione Gentili of San Ginesio in the Marche.

Sources and references

 
 
 

16th-century births
1613 deaths
People from the Province of Macerata
16th-century Italian painters
Italian male painters
17th-century Italian painters
16th-century Italian sculptors
Italian male sculptors
17th-century Italian sculptors